BC Academic Metropol Region  is a reestablished Bulgarian professional basketball club based in the capital Sofia.

In April 2022, Academic has been reborn and rebranded by the new owners, the german-bulgarian Ex-professional basketball player Viktor Vladov and Georgi Petrov.

Founded in 1947 as part of the Academic Sofia sports club, they have won the championship of Bulgaria 26 times, won the Bulgarian Cup 11 times and won the Bulgarian Super Cup 1 time. Among their international honours are two FIBA European Champions Cup finals (both lost to Rīgas ASK) in 1958 and 1959 and an International Students' Cup in 1957.

In 2000, the team were renamed Lukoil Academic as a sponsorship deal was signed with Russian oil giant Lukoil, and quickly established themselves as dominant in the Bulgarian Championship. Since then they have been a regular ULEB Cup participant, and won the FIBA Europe Regional Challenge Cup Conference South in 2003.

In September 2020, Academic withdrew from the NBL and announced that it will no longer maintain a professional team.

They played their home games at the Universiade Hall.

After the rebranding and reestablishing to "BC Academic Metropol Region"  in April 2022, the club will compete in the Bulgarian A-Grupa in season 2022/23. 

The club colours have been changed to dark blue and yellow, as of being more applieable to the traditional colours of Academic.

Manager Board and Sponsors 
The main owner of the club is the former professional basketball player Viktor Vladov (profession: banker).

Followed up by the manager board members Georgi Petrov, Emmanuel Tady and Mario Yurukov.

Additional founding members are: Plamen Martinov, Nikolay Petkov and Stanislav Michev.

The sponsors are also visible on the jersey and up to date are only minority sponsors with small amounts: 

"Porto Greco" Restaurant (Plovdiv, BUL), "Bryagovo Milk", "FruitCorrect", "bling Entertainment", "bikecity", "HCPKS" and "Idea Dent".

The team has also a non-profit with 2K to be implemented in NBA 2K22 and NBA 2K23 PlayStation 5 exclusive Add-Ons, which add various clubs from Europe to the videogame.

History
Basketball club Academic Sofia was founded in 1947 as a part of the students' sports association Academic and during its history of more than half a century it has won a just place among the best teams in the country. Under the guidance of ones of the most experienced coaches in Bulgarian basketball - Bozhidar Takev, Veselin Temkov, Neycho Neychev, Tzvetan Zheliazkov, Petko Marinov, etc., BC Academic is 20 times republic champion and nine times winner of the Bulgarian Cup. Along with the titles in the domestic championships and tournaments, naturally comes the international recognition. The basketball players of Academic have successfully played in the tournaments for the Cup of the European champions. With the coach Bozhidar Takev they were twice finalists against Rīgas ASK in 1958 and 1959. In 1957 in Paris the team of Academic became the world's students champion. During its entire existence basketball club Academic has always been a school for the professional improvement and constructive contribution of some of the best Bulgarian basketball players. Stars like Liubomir Panov, Georgi Panov, Viktor Radev, Nikola Ilov, Mihail Semov. Petar Lazarov, Dimitar Sahanikov, Georgi Barzakov, Nikola Atanasov, Atanas Golomeev, Temelaki Dimitrov, Stefan Filipov, Slavei Raychev, Vladimir Boyanov have left their permanent marks in the history of the Bulgarian basketball.

The excellent training of the Academic players and their complete devotion to the game have always been highly evaluated by our national basketball selectionists. Direct participants in the glorious moments of the Bulgarian basketball - the fifth place at the Olympic Games in Melbourne - 1956 and the vice-champion's title at the European Championship - Sofia'57 are the national players Liubomir Panov, Georgi Panov, Viktor Radev, Nikola Ilov, Mihail Semov, Petar Lazarov.

The glorious tradition of the club was revived again in 2000 when Lukoil Bulgaria became the main sponsor of the team. The selection of Lukoil Academic was oriented towards young and talented players, who under the clever guidance of the senior coach Petko Marinov and his assistants built the youngest team in the republican basketball. Renewed was also the work at the adolescents school of the club, from which some players have already shown considerable success at the home championships. The long-term strategy of Lukoil Academic has shown its first results already in season 2001–02. The talented players of Petko Marinov won the cup of the country and played the most attractive final in the play-offs in the championship for the last ten years. Today the name of Lukoil Academic is again a symbol of good basketball. The ambitions of the club are the republican champion's title and the good performance at the European club tournaments.

In 2018, Lukoil announced its sponsor deal with Levski Sofia, while leaving Academic with a smaller budget. Consequently, Academic sent its top players to Levski.

In 2022, Viktor Vladov and Georgi Petrov helped Academic to reborn its basketball team. The record champion of Bulgaria will restart from the season 2022/23 in the Bulgarian A Grupa.

Honours

Domestic competitions
 Bulgarian League 
 Winners (26): 1957, 1958, 1959, 1963, 1968, 1969, 1970, 1971, 1972, 1973, 1975, 1976, 2003, 2004, 2005, 2006, 2007, 2008, 2009, 2010, 2011, 2012, 2013, 2015 , 2016, 2017
 Bulgarian Cup
 Winners (11): 1952, 1954, 2002, 2003, 2004, 2006, 2007, 2008, 2011, 2012, 2013
 Bulgarian Basketball Super Cup
 Winners (1): 2016
 Runners-up (1): 2017

European competitions
 EuroLeague
 Runners-up (2): 1958, 1958–59
 FIBA Europe Conference South 
 Winners(1): 2003

Worldwide competitions
 International Students' Cup 
 Winners (1): 1957

Season by season

Current roster

Notable players

 Lyubomir Panov
 Chavdar Kostov
 Georgi Panov
 Viktor Radev
 Nikola Ilov
 Hristo Nikolov
 Mihail Semov
 Petar Lazarov
 Dimitar Sahanikov
 Georgi Barzakov
 Nikola Atanasov
 Atanas Golomeev
 Temelaki Dimitrov
 Stefan Filipov
 Slavey Raychev
 Vladimir Boyanov
 Charles Jones
 Lamont Jones
  Donta Smith
 Lamont Mack
 Dominic James
 Travis Peterson
 Antonio Burks
  Willie Deane 
  Priest Lauderdale
 Bryant Smith
 Larry O'Bannon
 Dee Brown
 Taliek Brown
 Brandon Heath
 Killian Larson
 David Simon
 Anthony Beane
 Danny Gibson
 Stephen Zack
 Melsahn Basabe
 Pero Antić
 Riste Stefanov
 Gjorgji Čekovski
 Damjan Stojanovski
 Thomas Massamba
 Kenny Adeleke
 Kaspars Kambala
 Mohamed Abukar
 Kieron Achara
 Mate Skelin
 Željko Šakić
 Jure Lalić
 Nenad Čanak
 Nikola Dragović
 Bojan Popović
 Slavko Stefanović
 Branislav Ratkovica
 Saša Zagorac
 Filip Barović

Head coaches
 Bozhidar Takev
 Veselin Temkov
 Neycho Neychev
 Tsvetan Zhelyazkov
 Petko Marinov
 Željko Lukajić
 Marin Dokuzovski
 Eduard Valchev

References

External links
 Lukoil Academic at Basketball-bg.com 
 Lukoil Academic at BulgarianBasket.com 
 Eurobasket.com PBC Academic Lukoil Page

Lukoil Academic
Basketball teams established in 1947
Sport in Sofia
Lukoil
1947 establishments in Bulgaria